Ghana competed at the 2012 Summer Paralympics in London, United Kingdom from August 29 to September 9, 2012. The team included people who had survived polio.

Athletics 

Men's Track and Road Events

Women's Track and Road Events

Cycling

Road

Men

Powerlifting 

Men

See also

 Ghana at the 2012 Summer Olympics

References

Nations at the 2012 Summer Paralympics
2012
2012 in Ghanaian sport